Old & In the Way was a bluegrass group formed in 1973. It was composed of Peter Rowan (guitar, vocals), Vassar Clements (fiddle), Jerry Garcia (banjo, vocals), David Grisman (mandolin, vocals), and John Kahn (string bass). When the group was forming, it was intended that John Hartford would be the fiddle player. Based on Hartford's engagements, and Clements' reputational stature in the bluegrass community, Clements became the group's fiddler.

The group performed traditional tunes such as "Pig in a Pen" as well as bluegrass-flavored versions of the Rolling Stones' "Wild Horses" and Peter Rowan's "Panama Red". The group had a short existence playing a total of approximately 50 live shows through much of 1973 then briefly reconvening for one bluegrass festival in 1974. All the official Old & In The Way releases consist of live recordings made in San Francisco in October 1973.

Old & in the Way's self-titled debut album, which was released in 1975, went on to become one of the best selling bluegrass albums of all time. The group, without Jerry Garcia and John Kahn, released a reunion album in 2002, called Old & In the Gray.

On July 31, 2015, Peter Rowan and David Grisman (the last two surviving members of Old and in the Way) performed a set with the String Cheese Incident, Chris Pandolfi (banjo) and Blaine Sprouse (fiddle) at the 20th annual Gathering of the Vibes in Bridgeport, Connecticut. They performed many Old & in the Way songs in addition to other covers and original compositions.

Personnel

Old & In the Way
 Jerry Garcia – banjo, vocals
 David Grisman – mandolin, vocals
 Peter Rowan – vocals, guitar
 Vassar Clements – fiddle
 John Kahn – bass
 Richard Greene – fiddle (original player during the group's first three months)
 John Hartford – fiddle (relieved Richard Greene during rehearsal sessions)

2002 reunion: Old & In the Gray
 David Grisman – mandolin, vocals
 Peter Rowan – vocals, guitar
 Vassar Clements – fiddle
 Herb Pedersen – banjo, guitar, vocals
 Bryn Bright – bass

Discography

References

External links
The Jerry Site for complete set lists of live Old & In the Way concerts.

American bluegrass music groups
Jerry Garcia
Musical groups from San Francisco
1973 establishments in California
1974 disestablishments in California
Musical groups established in 1973
Musical groups disestablished in 1974